Catseye (Sharon Smith) is a fictional character, a mutant appearing in American comic books published by Marvel Comics.

Publication history
Catseye was created by Chris Claremont and Sal Buscema in The New Mutants  #16-17 (June–July 1984).

Fictional character biography
Sharon Smith was a member of the original Hellions recruited by Emma Frost to be a competitive team to the New Mutants and a tool for the Hellfire Club. Her character was the antithesis of Wolfsbane who could transform into a wolf. She engaged in several battles with the New Mutants—mostly petty competition—but occasionally got along with the students, sometimes having dances to socialize. Her personality was that of a free spirit. Catseye's youth and comparative lack of sophistication belie a ferocious intelligence. She had a photographic memory and instinctively knew when she was being lied to. Under Frost's tutelage, Smith progressed from total illiteracy to upper grade school reading levels in less than a year. She still retained several feline qualities while in human form, having been forced to provide for herself since earliest infancy. Notably, she kept her tail in many instances. Upon her first meeting with Wolfsbane, rather than attack out of an animalistic nature, she smelled Rahne and said that as shapechangers the two of them shared a kindred spirit and that they should be friends — this in spite of the obviously played feline/canine feuding roles.

Emma Frost takes advantage of the New Mutants' emotional turmoil after an incident where a cosmic being called the Beyonder had actually killed them and then brought them back to life. She persuades the current headmaster of the school, Magneto, to send the students to the Massachusetts Academy for psychic counseling. There, she  promptly accepts them into the ranks of her Hellions. Catseye shares a room with Rahne, and the two of them become close friends. The two teams become quite fond of one another but were separated when Magneto realized that his mind had been manipulated by Empath and the decision to release the students had not been fully his.

Catseye and Wolfsbane later meet at a formal dress party sponsored by the Hellfire Club. The two sneak off, leave their dresses behind and romp in their animal forms.

Later, the two teams clash high above Manhattan. Both had learned about the existence of Bird-Brain, and neither team wanted the other to have him. The Hellions lose the encounter. Furthermore, an accident sends Catseye and Roulette plunging to the streets. Roulette's power saves them both, allowing them to land safely in a store canopy.

The White Queen later causes a confrontation between her team and the New Warriors over the fate of Firestar, a member of the Warriors who used to be a part of the Hellions. The battle, held in the New Warrior's penthouse, comes down to a game of numbers, and Catseye scored one for her team by viciously defeating Night Thrasher, easily tearing through his reinforced armor. Ultimately, the Hellions lost by attrition, though nobody defeated Catseye in turn.

Soon after, Emma threw another party which the Hellions as well as the X-Men Gold team attended. It was there that Trevor Fitzroy—a member of the villainous group known as the Upstarts—crashed the party with the goal of killing Emma in order to gain points within the group. Some of the Hellions died in the initial firefight. The rest, including Catseye, were killed in order to fuel Fitzroy's teleportation portal.

Post Death Illusions
Catseye makes a postmortem appearance in the 1997 Annual of Generation X. However, this was just a trick played by the demon D'Spayre to agitate Emma Frost.

Also in the Generation X #55-56, the Generation X members become trapped in an illusion by Adrienne Frost where each of them is a different Hellions member except for Jetstream. The afflicted heroes relive the Hellions' last day. Jubilee was Catseye.

Necrosha
Catseye, along with all the other deceased Hellions, is resurrected by Selene and Eli Bard. After breaking into Utopia with the help of Cypher, she and the other Hellions confront Emma Frost and taunt her for not saving them. She is subdued by Cyclops when she goes to attack Emma. Part of her return was also portrayed in two issues of the then-current New Mutants series.

Powers and abilities
Catseye's mutant power is ailuranthropy, the ability to become a cat. She can transform into either a housecat or a human-panther hybrid (a werecat). In her panther form, she has superhuman strength, speed, agility, reflexes, coordination, balance, and endurance in addition to hyper-keen senses, razor-sharp claws and fangs, a prehensile tail, a slight healing factor, and the ability to crawl up walls.

Even in her human form, she retained some catlike physical features such as slitted pupils and a tail.

Other versions

Age of Apocalypse
Catseye was still alive in the alternate reality called the Age of Apocalypse and was a Hellion. She and the others were hunted down and apprehended by the X-Men, after being knocked out by an enraged Wolfsbane while attempting to flee the beat-down of her fellow Hellions.

What If
In a reality where the original X-Men team disbands after the marriage of Cyclops and Marvel Girl, Catseye is recruited to fill the ranks of the new X-Men team. However, while investigating the presence of a new mutant, she - as well as the other X-Men and Professor X - is captured by the living island Krakoa and killed by being drained of her life energy.

References

External links
Uncannyxmen.net Character Profile on Catseye
Uncannyxmen.net feature on the Hellions

Characters created by Chris Claremont
Characters created by Sal Buscema
Comics characters introduced in 1984
Fictional characters with superhuman senses
Fictional werecats
Marvel Comics characters who are shapeshifters
Marvel Comics characters who can move at superhuman speeds
Marvel Comics characters with superhuman strength
Marvel Comics female supervillains
Marvel Comics mutants